The Grand Forks Herald is a daily broadsheet newspaper, established in 1879, published in Grand Forks, North Dakota, United States. It is the primary daily paper for northeast North Dakota and northwest Minnesota. Its average daily circulation is approximately 7,500, in the city of Grand Forks plus about 7,500 more to the surrounding communities. Total circulation includes digital subscribers. It has the second largest circulation in the state of North Dakota.

Grand Forks Herald Building

The Grand Forks Herald won a Pulitzer Prize for Public Service for its coverage of the 1997 flood but the prize was bittersweet, as the Herald building had not only been inundated but burned to the ground in the midst of the floodwaters.  Despite losing its offices during the flood, the Herald never missed a day of publication.  Temporary offices were set up at the University of North Dakota and at a nearby elementary school.  Papers were distributed free of charge to flood "refugees" in neighboring towns.

Following the flood, the newspaper rebuilt its office building in downtown Grand Forks.  Its distinctive features are a tall clock tower and the symbolism built into the structure, as well as parts of the old building that survived the fire.  A new printing facility was also built in an industrial park in the western part of Grand Forks.

The historic building was listed on the National Register of Historic Places in 1982. It was a two-story Art Moderne brick commercial building built in three parts, in 1939 (designed by Theodore B. Wells), 1949 and 1959.

Corporate ownership
Knight Ridder sold the Herald to The McClatchy Company on June 27, 2006. McClatchy had already arranged the sale of the Herald to Forum Communications, owner of The Forum of Fargo-Moorhead and WDAZ-TV in Grand Forks. Today, the Herald is one of many regional newspapers published by Forum Communications. After the sale, the newspaper ended its carrier delivery service and reduced its print copy; it is only printed 2 days a week: Tuesdays and Saturdays.

Newsroom

Editors

Korrie Wenzel (Publisher/Editor)
Sydney Mook (Managing Editor)
Wayne Nelson (Sports Editor)

Writers
Marilyn Hagerty (Columnist)
Brad Elliott Schlossman (College Hockey Reporter)
Tom Miller (Sports Reporter)
Brad Dokken (Outdoors Reporter)
Pamela Knudson (Reporter)
Joe Banish (Education Reporter)
Ingrid Harbo (Regional reporter)
Jacob Holley (Business reporter)
Meghan Arbegast (City/politics reporter)

Former personnel
Stuart McDonald (Editorial cartoonist, 1961-1967)
Robert Ridder (reporter)

References

External links

Grand Forks Herald website
Stuart McDonald Cartoon Collection Digitized cartoons of Stuart McDonald, editorial cartoonist of the Grand Forks Herald'' from 1961–1967

Commercial buildings on the National Register of Historic Places in North Dakota
Moderne architecture in North Dakota
Commercial buildings completed in 1939
Grand Forks County, North Dakota
Newspapers published in North Dakota
Greater Grand Forks
Pulitzer Prize-winning newspapers
Forum Communications Company
Clock towers in North Dakota
National Register of Historic Places in Grand Forks, North Dakota
Pulitzer Prize for Public Service winners
Buildings and structures destroyed by flooding
1997 Red River flood